Yudel Moreno Hernández (born 24 February 1983) is a Cuban javelin thrower. His personal best throw is 80.19 metres, achieved on 31 May 2006 in Valencia, Venezuela.

Career
He was born in Cienfuegos. He won the silver medal at the 2005 Central American and Caribbean Championships and at the 2006 Central American and Caribbean Games.

Achievements

References

External links

Tilastopaja biography

1983 births
Living people
Cuban male javelin throwers
People from Cienfuegos
Central American and Caribbean Games silver medalists for Cuba
Competitors at the 2006 Central American and Caribbean Games
Central American and Caribbean Games medalists in athletics
21st-century Cuban people
20th-century Cuban people